Musa ochracea is a plant in the banana and plantain family native to tropical Asia (in India). The specific epithet, "ochracea", is a Latin word meaning "ochracaceous" (ochre-colored).

References

ochracea
Flora of Assam (region)
Plants described in 1964